Sherston's Progress is the final book of Siegfried Sassoon's semi-autobiographical trilogy.  It is preceded by Memoirs of a Fox-Hunting Man and Memoirs of an Infantry Officer.

Synopsis
The book starts with his arrival at 'Slateford War Hospital' in Edinburgh (based on Craiglockhart War Hospital) for shell-shocked soldiers. Sherston has not been wounded, but has refused to continue fighting, causing himself a little temporary notoriety in England. The famous neurologist W. H. R. Rivers is a major character in the book (and had a profound influence on Sassoon in real life). After many sessions in which he gets to know himself and his motives better, he decides to ask to return to the front line.

Sherston is sent to Ireland (where he is introduced to 'The Mister', an alcoholic, eccentric millionaire) then Palestine, and finally to the Western Front in France. There, as captain of a company, he describes his admiration for his servant (Bond), his fellow officers and his men, and his state of mind. At the end of the short first stint at the front, he decides to go out with Corporal Davies to lob some Mills bombs at a German machine-gun post. On their way back, he is shot in the head by an experienced soldier (Sergeant Wickham) in his own company. He is reluctant to be sent to recover in London, where Rivers visits him in hospital.

External links
 

1936 British novels
Roman à clef novels
British autobiographical novels
Faber and Faber books
Books by Siegfried Sassoon
Books about mental health